Rhopobota bucera is a species of moth of the family Tortricidae. It is found in Shaanxi, China.

The wingspan is about 12.5 mm. The ground colour of the forewings is grey. The costa has seven pairs of strigulae (fine streaks). The hindwings are grey.

Etymology
The species name refers to the shape of the tegumentary projections in the male genitalia and is derived from Latin bucerus (meaning horned).

References

Moths described in 2005
Eucosmini